Pilot wings may refer to:

 Pilotwings, a flight simulator game series
 Pilotwings (video game), a flight simulator game for Super NES
 Pilotwings 64, a sequel for Nintendo 64
 Pilotwings Resort, a flight simulator game for Nintendo 3DS
 Aviator badge
 Aircrew Badge
 Aircrew brevet, a badge worn by qualified aircrew in several air forces and armies